Saint Begga (also Begue, Beghe, Begge) (b. 613 – d. 17 December 693 AD) was the daughter of Pepin of Landen, mayor of the palace of Austrasia, and his wife Itta of Metz. She is also the grandmother of Charles Martel, who is the grandfather of Charlemagne.

Life
The daughter of Pepin of Landen and his wife, Itta, Begga was the older sister of St Gertrude of Nivelles. She married Ansegisel, son of Arnulf, Bishop of Metz, and had three children: Pepin of Heristal, Martin of Laon, and Clotilda of Heristal, who married Theuderic III of the Franks. Ansegisel was killed sometime before 679, slain in a feud by his enemy Gundewin. Begga made a pilgrimage to Rome and upon her return, she took the veil, she had seven churches built at Andenne on the Meuse. There she spent the rest of her days as abbess. She was buried in Saint Begga's Collegiate Church in Andenne.

Veneration
She is commemorated on 17 December.

Some hold that the Beguine movement which came to light in the 12th century was actually founded by St Begga; and the church in the beguinage of Lier, Belgium, has a statue of St Begga standing above the inscription: St. Begga, our foundress. The Lier beguinage dates from the 13th century.

Another popular theory, however, claims that the Beguines derived their name from that of the priest Lambert le Bègue, under whose protection the witness and ministry of the Beguines flourished.

See also
 Saint Begga, patron saint archive

Footnotes

References
Andenne History of Andenne, Belgium
 Attwater, Donald & John, Catherine Rachel. The Penguin Dictionary of Saints. 3rd edition. New York: Penguin Books, 1993; 
 Saint Begga profile; catholic.org
 Baix, F. "Begge," in Dictionnaire d'histoire et de géographie ecclésiastiques, VII, ed. A. Baudrillart (Paris, 1934), cols. 441-48
 Heller, J., ed. Genealogiae ducum Brabantiae (Monumenta Germaniae Historica; SS, XXV), pp. 385–413, ref Genealogia ampliata, 1270
 Rousseau, Félix. "Le monastère mérovingien d'Andenne", ''À travers l'histoire de Namur, du Namurois et de la Wallonie. Recueil d'articles de Félix Rousseau (n.p., 1977), pp. 279–313

External links 
 Information about Saint Begga
 Saint Begga at Saints.sqpn.com

693 deaths
Belgian saints
Beguines and Beghards
Christian royal saints
Christian female saints of the Middle Ages
7th-century Frankish women
Pippinids
7th-century Frankish saints
People from Andenne
613 births